Lampang may refer to
the town Lampang
Lampang Province
Mueang Lampang district
Lampang Airport